Ogden Gavanski is a film producer from Canada who has worked on local and American productions. He has worked with well-known Hollywood actors and also co-produced with Pedro Almodovar.

Career 
Gavanski has produced various films including Tremors 5: Bloodlines, Cult of Chucky, Liberty Stands Still, The Man with the Iron Fists 2, Man About Town (2006 film) and The Scorpion King 4: Quest for Power. He's worked with Hollywood actors such as Ben Affleck, Rebecca Romijn, John Cleese, Lou Ferrigno, Rutger Hauer, Wesley Snipes, and Linda Fiorentino.

Gavanski also co-produced My Life Without Me with Pedro Almodovar in 2003. Starring Sarah Polley and Mark Ruffalo, the film won the "German Art House Cinemas" award at the Berlin Film Festival and garnered a nomination for best film at the European Film Awards. The film also won a best feature Leo Award, which celebrates excellence in British Columbia's film and television industry.

Gavanski is one of the owners of Milestone Production, a Vancouver production company founded in 1996. The company has worked with Vancouver-based Trimark Holdings, which was purchased by Lions Gate Entertainment in 2000. Gavanski is a member of the Directors Guild of Canada.

Filmography 
 2019 Inside Man: Most Wanted
 2019 Doom: Annihilation
 2017 Dead Again in Tombstone
 2017 Cult of Chucky
 2015 Tremors 5: Bloodlines
 2015 The Man with the Iron Fists 2
 2015 The Scorpion King 4: Quest for Power
 2013 Warm Bodies (film)
 2011 Immortals (2011 film)
 2008 Punisher: War Zone
 2008 Thomas Kinkade's Christmas Cottage
 2008 The Eye
 2007 Why Did I Get Married? 
 2007 Good Luck Chuck 
 2006 Black Christmas (2006 film)
 2006 Man About Town (2006 film)
 2005 Fierce People
 2003 My Life Without Me 
 2002 Liberty Stands Still
 2001 Turbulence 3: Heavy Metal
 1999-2000 Nothing Too Good for a Cowboy (TV Series)

Background and education 
Of Serbian descent, Gavanski immigrated to Canada from Bosnia-Herzegovina when he was a child. He holds a bachelor's degree in political science and two master's degrees, one in film production and the other in political science.

References

External links

Canadian television producers
Canadian film producers
Canadian people of Serbian descent
Living people
Year of birth missing (living people)